Eric Aiken (born April 8, 1980 in Marysville, Ohio) is a professional boxer from the United States in the featherweight division. His record is 16-11-1 (12 KOs). He is the former IBF world featherweight champion.

Life before boxing
According to the February 1, 2008 broadcast of Friday Night Fights on ESPN2, Aiken was a paralegal before turning professional. During his amateur career, Aiken compiled a 97-5 record with 47 knockouts. In addition, he won numerous state titles, the Mayor's Cup and the Nationals twice.

Pro career
On April 1, 2006, Aiken defeated former IBF bantamweight champion Tim Austin by sixth-round TKO. Only one month later (on May 13, 2006), Aiken challenged undefeated IBF featherweight champion Valdemir Pereira for the title. In the bout, Aiken knocked down Pereira in rounds four and five. Throughout the bout, Pereira hit Aiken with shots that were below the belt, and he was penalized one point in rounds six and seven. After another below the belt shot by Pereira in round eight, the referee disqualified him, and Aiken was awarded the title.

Aiken lost the title on September 2, 2006 against Robert Guerrero.

On February 1, 2008, in Monroeville, Pennsylvania, Aiken lost to Monty Meza-Clay by seventh-round technical knockout.

Professional boxing record

See also
List of featherweight boxing champions

References

External links
 
 Eric Aiken – BoxRec Boxing Encyclopedia

1980 births
Living people
Boxers from Ohio
Featherweight boxers
World featherweight boxing champions
International Boxing Federation champions
People from Marysville, Ohio
American male boxers